Pojken på månen is an album by Rikard Wolff, which was released in 1995.

The title song, released as a single that year, was a hit. The lyrics are by Wolff, and the music by Lisa Ekdahl; Wolff described it as a song "about mothers and sons, loss and longing" that he had intended as a ballad, but Ekdahl's arrangement was up-tempo. It has also been seen as being about a friend of Wolff's who committed suicide.

Track listing
 Pojken På Månen (The Boy on the Moon)
 Tystnaden (The Silence)
 Bind En Duk (Tie a Cloth)
 Paris
 Inuti Dig (Inside You)
 Det Vackraste Mötet (The Most Beautiful Meeting)
 Röda Dina Läppar (Red Your Lips)
 Oslo
 I Den Vita Staden (In the White City)
 Svart (Black)
 Stazione Termini (Termini)
 Allt Du Kan Önska (All You Can Wish For)

References

External links
Pojken På Månen at ciao.se

1995 albums